Markopoulo Olympic Complex is a sports complex in Athens, Greece. It held two of the sports venues used during the 2004 Summer Olympics.

Markopoulo Olympic Equestrian Centre

Markopoulo Olympic Shooting Centre

References

Badminton venues
Venues of the 2004 Summer Olympics
Sports venues in Greece
Olympic Parks